Langroya is a village situated on Chandigarh Road near Nawanshahr in Shahid Bhagat Singh Nagar district, Punjab, India. Its population is about 10,000.

Facilities
Langroya has two big gurudwaras and several other temples, including Mata Da Mandir, Shiv Duala, Kutiya Sant Baba Karam Singh and Jhunda Ji. There is a senior secondary school, post office, telephone exchange, Punjab National Bank, Cooperative Bank, a community health center, and a veterinary hospital. There is a Kutiya of Baba Kukar Dass.

Pin code: 144516

Villages in Shaheed Bhagat Singh Nagar district